Yaouk is a locality in the Snowy Monaro Region, New South Wales, Australia. It lies in open grassland valleys surrounded by mountains on both sides of the Murrumbidgee River, downstream from and east of the Tantangara Dam, north of Adaminaby, east of the Kosciuszko National Park and south of the Namadgi National Park in the Australian Capital Territory, but separated from it by the mountainous Scabby Range. It is about 110 km south of Canberra and about 75 km northwest of Cooma.

History 
Yaouk is named after the Yaouk Run, a 4,096 hectare "squatter's run" first held by Henry Hall in 1838.

Heritage listing 
Yaouk has a number of heritage-listed sites, including:

 Sams River Fire Trail: Scabby Range Nature Reserve

References

Snowy Monaro Regional Council
Localities in New South Wales
Yaouk, New South Wales